Thomas Dybdahl (born 12 April 1979) is a Norwegian singer-songwriter and multi-instrumentalist.

Background 
Thomas Dybdahl grew up in Sandnes, Norway. His musical career started off as the guitarist in the band Quadraphonics. The band released one album in 2002 on Oslove Records.

Career
Dybdahl released his first single as a solo artist EP, Bird, in 2000. His second EP from 2001 was titled John Wayne.

Beginning with the release of his first album, ...That Great October Sound, in 2002, the first part of his "October" series, he received national and even international appreciation for his work. Since then, and especially after the European release in 2004, Dybdahl's notability has increased significantly. The mostly positive reviews tout Dybdahl as a new pop wonder comparable to  Nick Drake, Jeff Buckley and other solo artists. He received the Spellemannprisen and the Alarm Award for his work.

The release of his next two albums, Stray Dogs (European release in 2005) and One Day You'll Dance for Me, New York City, further increased his standing as a respected artist.

The album One Day You'll Dance for Me, New York City features the Norwegian philosopher Arne Næss speaking of quality of life, as a sort of interlude.

In 2004, Dybdahl teamed up with artists from the bands Jaga Jazzist and BigBang on the project The National Bank, which immediately entered the Norwegian charts with the project's self-titled debut album. It was released outside Norway in 2009.

His single "Damn Heart", written for the Danish movie En Soap, was released in 2006 on Copenhagen Records.

In 2007, Dybdahl performed as an opening act in the US for fellow Norwegian artist Sondre Lerche, and in 2011 he opened for Tori Amos during her Night of Hunters tour.

On 24 February 2017, his album The Great Plains was released. His eighth solo studio album All These Things came out at 12 October 2018.

Discography

Studio albums

Soundtracks
2006: Music from the Movie Rottenetter (1MicAdventure)
2015: This Love Is Here to Stay (House of Lies season 3, episode 11)

Compilation albums
2006: October Trilogy (box set featuring his first three albums, the remastered DVD and a bonus CD) (NOR #36)
2009: Thomas Dybdahl: En samling (NOR #9)
2011: Songs

EPs and singles
2000: Bird EP
2001 John Wayne EP
2003 Rain down on Me
2004 A Lovestory
2006: Damn Heart
2010: Cecilia
2015: Thomas Dybdahl & In the Country featuring In the Country, EP (vinyl and digital release)

Other releases
1998: Q, with the Quadrophonics
2004: The National Bank, with The National Bank
2008: Come On Over to the Other Side, with The National Bank
2008: Dive Deep, with Morcheeba

DVDs
2003: That Great October DVD (remastered in 2005)
2009: Live at Paradiso, Amsterdam DVD

References

External links

 Official website
 Official MySpace page
 Fanpage – unofficial Thomas Dybdahl Fanpage, includes a complete discography, tour news, a huge link collection, downloads, reviews and photographs
  Interview with Thomas Dybdahl for www.4ortherecord.com

1979 births
Living people
Musicians from Sandnes
Norwegian singer-songwriters
Norwegian folk singers
Norwegian folk guitarists
Norwegian rock guitarists
Norwegian male guitarists
Norwegian expatriates in Denmark
Spellemannprisen winners
Norwegian multi-instrumentalists
21st-century Norwegian singers
21st-century Norwegian guitarists
21st-century Norwegian male singers
The National Bank (band) members